Beilschmiedia ambigua is a species of plant in the family Lauraceae. It is endemic to the Democratic Republic of the Congo.  It is threatened by habitat loss.

Distribution
Beilschmiedia ambigua is found in the Marungu highlands, along the Pweto and Moba roads, and also along the western shores of Lake Tanganyika.

Threats
One concern for the Beilschmiedia ambigua species is that its native habitat has become degraded by logging, and the stream banks have become eroded by cattle.

References

ambigua
Endemic flora of the Democratic Republic of the Congo
Vulnerable flora of Africa
Taxonomy articles created by Polbot